Mersin İdmanyurdu (also Mersin İdman Yurdu, Mersin İY, or MİY) Sports Club; located in Mersin, east Mediterranean coast of Turkey in 1999–2000. Mersin İdmanyurdu (MİY) participated in Second League 1999–00 season for the 26th time. MİY could not attend promotion group and promotion play-offs, therefore couldn't promote. The team also participated in Turkish Cup in 1999–00 and eliminated at Round 3.

Macit Özcan was club president. Ali Gültiken started the season, which was his first head coaching experience. Later Müjdat Yalman took over the team. Murat Akay had the most appearances, while Ersan Parlatan was top goalscorer. The stats are low this season due to the withdrawal of teams who were severely affected by the 1999 İzmit earthquake.

1999–2000 Second League participation
Mersin İdmanyurdu took place in Group 1 in 1999–2000 Second League season. League was played in three stages. In the first stage, 50 teams in five groups (10 clubs in each) played for the first two rankings to play in the promotion group. The promotion group consisted of those 10 teams. At the end of the second stage top two teams promoted to 2000–01 First League. The remaining 8 teams in each ranking group played in classification groups, by carrying points and goals from ranking groups. Bottom two teams in Groups 2, 4, 5 relegated to 2000–01 Third League at the end of the season. Due to the earthquake that occurred on August 17, 1999, Sakaryaspor and Düzcespor in Group 1 and Darıca Gençlerbirliği in Group 3 withdrew from the league and demanded excuse. TFF has decided that the teams would not be relegated. One another worst team from Group 1 and two other worst teams in Group 3 had relegated at the end of the season. In the third stage, 8 clubs (3 from the promotion group and 1 each from 5 classification groups) played one-leg play-off games in Antalya Atatürk Stadium to determine the third team to be promoted to First League.

Mersin İdmanyurdu took place in Group 1 consisted of 10 teams and finished the first stage at 7th place and couldn't take a place in the promotion group. In the classification group, the team finished 4th and could not attend to promotion play-off games.

Results summary
Mersin İdmanyurdu (MİY) 1999–2000 Second League season league summary:

Sources: 1999–2000 Turkish Second Football League pages.

Ranking group league table
Mersin İY's league performance in 1999–2000 Second League Ranking Group 1 season is shown in the following table.

Three points for a win. Rules for classification: 1) points; 2) tie-break; 3) goal difference; 4) number of goals scored. In the score columns first scores belong to MİY.
 (Q): Qualified to 1999–2000 Second League Promotion Group.Source: 1999–2000 Turkish Second Football League pages from TFF website, Turkish-Soccer website, and Maçkolik website.

Ranking group games
Mersin İdmanyurdu (MİY) 1999–2000 Second League season first half game reports in Ranking Group 1 is shown in the following table.
Kick off times are in EET and EEST.

Sources: 1999–2000 Turkish Second Football League pages.

Classification group league table
Classification group 1 was played with 8 teams remaining after top two of ranking group were promoted to promotion group. Top team in the group promoted to promotion play-offs, while bottom two teams relegated to 1999–2000 Third League season. Points and goals were carried from ranking group. MİY obtained 7 wins, 3 draws and 4 losses and finished fourth. However,  because points and goals were carried from ranking group, in aggregate MİY finished fifth and did not play promotion play-offs. Mersin İY's league performance in Second League Classification Group 1 in 1999–2000 season is shown in the following table.

Three points for a win. Rules for classification: 1) points; 2) tie-break; 3) goal difference; 4) number of goals scored. In the score columns first scores belong to MİY.
 (Q): Qualified to 1999–2000 Promotion Play-offs;  (R): Relegated to 2000–01 Turkish Third Football League.Source: 1999–2000 Turkish Second Football League pages from TFF website, Turkish-Soccer website, and Maçkolik website.

Classification group games
Mersin İdmanyurdu (MİY) 1999–2000 Second League season first half game reports in Classification Group 1 is shown in the following table.
Kick off times are in EET and EEST.

Sources: 1999–2000 Turkish Second Football League pages.

1999–2000 Turkish Cup participation
1999–2000 Turkish Cup was played by 64 teams in 4 rounds prior to quarterfinals in one-leg elimination system. [Mersin İdmanyurdu] had participated in 38th Turkish Cup (played as Türkiye Kupası in 1999–00) from Round 1 and eliminated at Round 2. The opponents in first round were 3rd League team Ceyhanspor. In Round 2, 2nd League team BB Ankaraspor eliminated MİY. Galatasaray won the cup for the 13th time.

Cup track
The drawings and results Mersin İdmanyurdu (MİY) followed in 1999–00 Turkish Cup are shown in the following table.

Note: In the above table 'Score' shows For and Against goals whether the match played at home or not.

Game details
Mersin İdmanyurdu (MİY) 1999–00 Turkish Cup game reports is shown in the following table.
Kick off times are in EET and EEST.

Source: 1999–2000 Turkish Cup pages.

Management

Club management
Macit Özcan, mayor of Mersin city was president. Özcan elected President in club congress after 18 April 1999 local elections. Mayors presided the club many times in its history.

Coaching team
Ali Gültiken was head coach at the start of the season. After 4th round Müjdat Yalman, who coached team in previous season came to the position.

1999–2000 Mersin İdmanyurdu head coaches:

Note: Only official games were included. 8 of the wins were awarded. See above tables within date ranges.

1999–2000 squad
Appearances, goals and cards count for 1999–00 Second League Ranking and Classification Groups games and 1999–00 Turkish Cup games. 18 players appeared in each game roster, three to be replaced. Only the players who appeared in game rosters were included and listed in order of appearance.

Sources: TFF club page and maçkolik team page.

See also
 Football in Turkey
 1999–00 Turkish Second Football League
 1999–00 Turkish Cup

Notes and references

Mersin İdman Yurdu seasons
Turkish football clubs 1999–2000 season